DeKalb Community Unit School District 428  is a school district headquartered in DeKalb, Illinois.

Schools
High school:
 DeKalb High School

Middle schools:
 Clinton Rosette Middle School
 Huntley Middle School

Elementary schools:
 Brooks Elementary School
 Cortland Elementary School
 Founders Elementary School
 Jefferson Elementary School
 Lincoln Elementary School
 Littlejohn Elementary School
 Malta Elementary School
 Tyler Elementary School

Preschool:
 Early Learning & Development Center (ELDC)

References

External links
 
School districts in Illinois
Education in DeKalb County, Illinois